The following lists events that happened during 1878 in South Africa.

Incumbents
 Governor of the Cape of Good Hope and High Commissioner for Southern Africa: Henry Barkly.
 Lieutenant-governor of the Colony of Natal: Henry Ernest Gascoyne Bulwer.
 State President of the Orange Free State: Jan Brand.
 State President of the South African Republic: Thomas François Burgers.
 Lieutenant-Governor of Griqualand West: William Owen Lanyon.
 Prime Minister of the Cape of Good Hope: John Gordon Sprigg.

Events
March
 12 – Commander R.C. Dryer takes possession of the area surrounding Walvis Bay.

May
 14 – Paul Kruger leads a second deputation to the United Kingdom to demand the freedom of the South African Republic.

July
 17 – Nqwiliso, tribal chief of western Mpondoland and eldest son of the warrior Chief Ndamase, ceded sovereign rights of Umzimvubu River mouth to the Cape Colony

December
 11 – The British present an ultimatum to the Zulu king Cetshwayo, triggering the Anglo-Zulu War.

Unknown date
 The 9th Cape Frontier War ends.
 The first telephones are set up in the Cape.
 The telegraph service between Natal and Transvaal is opened.
 The British suspend the elected Cape Government and assume direct control, after escalating disagreements on confederation and frontier policy.
 The last confirmed Cape lion dies.

Births
 14 March – Alexander du Toit, geologist. (d. 1948)

Deaths

Railways

Railway lines opened
 25 May – Natal – Umgeni to Avoca, .
 1 August – Cape Midland – Glenconnor to Mount Stewart, .
 15 August – Cape Eastern – Kei Road to Döhne, .
 15 August – Cape Eastern – East London to Landing Jetty, .
 4 September – Natal – Durban to Pinetown, .

 4 November – Cape Western – Kleinstraat to Grootfontein, .

Locomotives
 The Cape Government Railways places a second locomotive in service on construction work on the Kowie harbour project at Port Alfred, a  broad gauge  saddle-tank engine named Aid.

References

 
South Africa
Years in South Africa